Calcium channel, voltage-dependent, T type, alpha 1I subunit, also known as CACNA1I or Cav3.3 is a protein which in humans is encoded by the CACNA1I gene.

Function 
Voltage-dependent calcium channels can be distinguished based on their voltage-dependence, deactivation, and single-channel conductance. Low-voltage-activated calcium channels are referred to as 'T' type because their currents are both transient, owing to fast inactivation, and tiny, owing to small conductance. T-type channels are thought to be involved in pacemaker activity, low-threshold calcium spikes, neuronal oscillations and resonance, and rebound burst firing.

See also
 T-type calcium channel

References

External links
 
 

Ion channels
Integral membrane proteins